Cache National Forest is a 533,840-acre area of National Forest System land in Idaho and Utah which was established on July 1, 1908 by the U.S. Forest Service. The majority of its area is in Utah, and was initially created when the Bear River National Forest was disbanded. On July 1, 1915, all of Pocatello National Forest was added. In 1973 the Idaho portion was transferred to the administration of Caribou National Forest, while the Utah portion was combined administratively with Wasatch National Forest, creating the Wasatch-Cache National Forest. In descending order of forestland area, the Cache National Forest portion is located in Cache, Bear Lake, Franklin, Weber, Rich, Box Elder, Caribou, and Morgan counties. (Bear Lake, Franklin, and Caribou counties are in Idaho, and the rest in Utah.) The forest is administered from Salt Lake City, Utah as part of the Wasatch-Cache National Forest, but there are local ranger district offices in Logan and Ogden. From circa 1911 until August 1923, the area was roamed by Old Ephraim.

Wilderness areas
There are two officially designated wilderness areas within the former Cache National Forest that are part of the National Wilderness Preservation System.
 Mount Naomi Wilderness
 Wellsville Mountain Wilderness

References

External links
Forest History Society
Listing of the National Forests of the United States and Their Dates (Forest History Society website) Text from Davis, Richard C., ed. Encyclopedia of American Forest and Conservation History. New York: Macmillan Publishing Company for the Forest History Society, 1983. Vol. II, pp. 743-788.

Former National Forests of Idaho
Former National Forests of Utah
Protected areas established in 1908
1908 establishments in Idaho
1908 establishments in Utah
Protected areas disestablished in 1973
1973 disestablishments in Idaho
1973 disestablishments in Utah